Davidovac may refer to:

 Davidovac Airport or Paraćin Airport, a civil airport near the town of Paraćin, Serbia
 Davidovac, Kladovo, a village in the Kladovo municipality of Bor District, Serbia
 Davidovac, Vranje, a village in the Vranje municipality of Pčinja District, Serbia
 Davidovac, Paraćin, a village in the Paraćin municipality, Serbia
 Davidovac, Svrljig, a village in the Svrljig municipality, Serbia

See also
Davidovo (disambiguation), a toponym in Bulgaria and Republic of Macedonia
Davidovica, a village in the Gornji Milanovac municipality, Serbia
Davidovica monastery, a monastery in the Brodarevo municipality, Serbia
Davidovce, a village in the Štimlje municipality, Kosovo